The Mangakino caldera complex (other names are Mangakino volcanic center, Mangakino Caldera) is the westernmost and one of oldest extinct rhyolitic caldera volcanoes in the Taupō Volcanic Zone of New Zealand's North Island. However this was only in its most recent caldera forming phase from 1.21 to 0.91 million years ago as it had a previous caldera generating phase from 1.62 to 1.51 million years ago. There are at least 11 major historic eruptions assigned to this complex. At least 5 of these contributed significant welded ignimbrite deposits that represent major pyroclastic events in the central North Island.

Later many of these deposits were covered over by deposits from other eruptive centres such as those of the Oruanui eruption.

References

External links

Rift volcanoes
Taupō Volcanic Zone
Supervolcanoes
VEI-8 volcanoes
Pleistocene calderas
Calderas of New Zealand
Volcanoes of Waikato